Ministry or Minister of Police may refer to
Ministry for Police and Emergency Services (New South Wales), Australia, which existed from 2011 to 2015
Minister for Police and Emergency Services (New South Wales), Australia, which still exists
Minister for Police, Fire and Emergency Services (Northern Territory), Australia
Minister for Police (Victoria), Australia
Minister for Police (Western Australia), Australia
Ministry of Police (France), which existed from 1796 to 1818
Minister of Police (France)
Ministry of Public Security (Israel), known from 1948 to 1995 as the Ministry of Police
List of Ministers for the Police Force of Luxembourg, which existed from 1969 to 1999
Minister of Police (New Zealand)
Ministry of Justice and Public Security, Norway, known from 1819 to 2012 as the Ministry of Justice and the Police
Minister of Justice and Public Security
Ministry of Police of the Russian Empire, which existed from 1810 to 1819
Minister of Police (South Africa)
Minister for Policing, United Kingdom